Mohammad Sarfaraz, known as Sarfi, is an Indian international ice stock sport athlete. Sarfi has a right hand style and has represented India at an international level. 
In 2018 Mohammad Sarfaraz led India to a tenth place finish at the World Championships in Austria.

Mohammad Sarfaraz has captained the Indian ice stock sport national team since 2018. He is currently Asia’s highest scorer in Target Competition, a score of 154 which he achieved in Single’s Target Event in Harbin, China International Cup 2019. He is also the head coach of senior men and women teams for Ice Stock Sport in Jammu and Kashmir. He also monitors the progress of J&K A and J&K under-19 Stock sports teams.

References

Living people
Indian sportsmen
Ice stock sport
1986 births